Nelson's woodrat (Neotoma nelsoni) is a species of rodent in the family Cricetidae. It is endemic to Mexico, where it is known only from the eastern slopes of the volcanoes Orizaba and Cofre de Perote. Due to the small geographic range, isolation, and low population, the Nelson's woodrat has a higher risk for extinction. The distribution and population sizes are small. The population exists in geographic isolation, which prevents gene flow

Location 
The Nelson's woodrat can only be found on the eastern side of the volcanoes Pico de Orizaba and Cofre de Perote in Mexico. The estimated area for where this species is located is 1,350 km2. This area includes steep slopes, coffee plantations, and a cloud forest.

 Elevation range: 970–2,770 m
 Climate: Humid and warm
 Precipitation: Rain throughout all months of the year
 Vegetation: Tropical rain forest

Characteristics 

 Upper Body
 Cinnamon color
 White throat
 Grayish brown cheeks
 Short and silky hairs
 Nasal is wedge-shaped
 Lower Body
 Tail is multicolored and scaly
 Toes are an off-white color

Average measurements 

 Total Length: 300 mm 
 Tail vertebrae: 143 mm 
 Hindfoot: 30 mm 
 Ear: 22 mm

Threats 
Currently the Nelson's woodrat is threatened by agriculture and invasive species. In Mexico, a conversion to agriculture is taking place which is taking away the home of the Nelson's woodrat. Exotic and invasive species pose a threat to the Nelson's woodrat as potential predators.

References

Neotoma
Endemic mammals of Mexico
Fauna of the Trans-Mexican Volcanic Belt
Rodents of North America
Critically endangered biota of Mexico
Nelson's woodrat
Mammals described in 1905
Taxonomy articles created by Polbot